Codreanca is a commune in Strășeni District, Moldova. It is composed of two villages, Codreanca and Lupa-Recea.

References

Communes of Strășeni District
Orgeyevsky Uyezd